is an underground metro station located in Tsuzuki-ku, Yokohama, Kanagawa Prefecture, Japan, operated by the Yokohama Municipal Subway's  Blue Line (Line 3). There is a sub-name called "Tokyo Metropolitan University Yokohama Campus".

Lines
Nakagawa Station is served by the Yokohama Municipal Subway Blue Line, and is 38.4 kilometers from the terminus of the Blue Line at Shōnandai Station.

Station layout
Nakagawa Station has two opposed side platforms serving two tracks.

Platforms

History
Nakagawa Station opened on March 18, 1993.

Platform screen doors were installed in April 2007.

Surrounding area
 Tokyo City University Yokohama Campus

References

External links

  

Railway stations in Kanagawa Prefecture
Railway stations in Japan opened in 1993
Blue Line (Yokohama)